Ahmed Farah Dualeh is a Somali-Danish community worker and politician. He is the President of Jubaland, a region comprising the three Jubba Valley regions of Gedo, Middle Jubba and Lower Jubba.

Early life
Dualeh was born and raised in Somalia. He finished his primary and secondary education domestically.

In 1967, he was granted a scholarship by the Danish Foreign Ministry to study in Denmark.

Dualeh subsequently studied navigation at the Nautical Institute of Copenhagen, where he graduated as Master of 1st Class. He immediately afterwards started a naval career as a shipmaster, and worked in this capacity for approximately 20 years across all oceans and continents. He also studied Law and Business administration, graduating with an MBA.

Additionally, Dualeh served as a representative for the Somali community in Scandinavia. He helped immigrant families adapt to their new surroundings in various cities and towns in the larger region.

President of Jubaland
In 2012, Dualeh was appointed President of Jubaland State of Somalia, an autonomous region in southern Somalia noted for its agriculture, fishing, livestock and mineral resources.

References

Somalian politicians
Living people
Year of birth missing (living people)